Marc Mateu Sanjuán (born 16 June 1990) is a Spanish footballer who plays for SD Huesca. Mainly a central midfielder, he can also play as a winger.

Club career
Mateu was born in Valencia. Having emerged through local Levante UD's youth academy, he made his first-team debut during the 2008–09 season, in a Segunda División game against Córdoba CF (3–0 home win, 25 minutes played).

On 10 August 2010, Mateu signed his first professional contract, running until 2013, and was loaned to Segunda División B club Real Unión. He subsequently served loans at CD Badajoz and Deportivo Aragón, signing permanently with the latter side after cutting ties with Levante in July 2012.

On 30 May 2013, Mateu was released by Zaragoza after a bout of indiscipline. He moved to Villarreal CF's C team in October, and was promoted to the reserves the following year.

On 28 July 2015, Mateu signed for CD Numancia of the second tier. He scored his first professional goal on 3 April 2016, the decider in a 3–2 home victory over SD Huesca.

Mateu was a regular starter during his spell at the Nuevo Estadio Los Pajaritos, leaving after relegation in 2020. On 23 August of that year, he agreed to a two-year deal with CD Castellón, recently returned to the second division.

On 29 June 2021, after another relegation, Mateu signed a two-year contract with SD Huesca still in division two.

Career statistics

References

External links

1990 births
Living people
Spanish footballers
Footballers from Valencia (city)
Association football midfielders
Association football wingers
Segunda División players
Segunda División B players
Tercera División players
Atlético Levante UD players
Levante UD footballers
Real Unión footballers
CD Badajoz players
Real Zaragoza B players
Villarreal CF C players
Villarreal CF B players
CD Numancia players
CD Castellón footballers
SD Huesca footballers